This is a list of aviation-related events from 2017.

Civil aviation
In 2017, airlines launched more than 3,500 routes led by Ryanair with 278 followed by Eurowings with 125 and Wizz Air with 104, mostly in US with 971, 464 in Germany and 425 in Spain, the airports with most new routes were Munich with 55, Frankfurt with 51, Birmingham and London Stansted with 47.

Deadliest crash
The deadliest crash of this year was a military accident, namely the 2017 Myanmar Air Force Shaanxi Y-8 crash which crashed into the Andaman Sea near Myanmar on 7 June 2017 killing all 122 people on board. The deadliest civil aviation crash of this year was Turkish Airlines Flight 6491, a Boeing 747 cargo freighter that crashed during landing in Bishkek, Kyrgyzstan on 16 January, killing all four people on board, as well as 35 on the ground.

Events

January

12 January
Iran receives the first of 100 Airbus airliners it purchased after signing the Joint Comprehensive Plan of Action for its nuclear program in 2015. The first aircraft is an Airbus A321 that arrives at Tehran, completing its delivery flight from Toulouse, France. The arrival of the A321 is the first step in Iran's plan to recapitalize its aging civil aviation fleet, which has received few new aircraft since the Iran's Islamic Revolution of 1979. Plans also call for Iran to begin taking delivery in 2018 of 80 Boeing airliners it ordered.

16 January
 After a missed approach in thick fog while attempting to land at Manas International Airport in Bishkek, Kyrgyzstan, Turkish Airlines Flight 6491, a Boeing 747-412F cargo aircraft (registration TC-MCL) belonging to and crewed by MyCargo Airlines, crashes in the village of Dachi Suu while attempting a go-around, killing all four people on the plane and at least 37 on the ground, and injuring at least 15 people. The plane, breaking into pieces, plows through several hundred meters of the town, destroying at least 32 houses and damaging dozens of buildings.

17 January
 Australia, the People's Republic of China, and Malaysia announce that they have suspended indefinitely the underwater search they have led for Malaysian Airlines Flight 370, a Boeing 777 that disappeared on 8 March 2014 with 239 people on board. Rejecting a December 2016 Australian Transport Safety Bureau suggestion that the search zone move  farther north, the three countries announce that they do not plan to resume the search unless convincing new evidence surfaces that identifies the likely location of the aircraft.

18 January
The B-2s drop 108 bombs and, making a nonstop flight to Libya and back from Whiteman Air Force Base in Missouri, spend 34 hours continuously in the air; it is the first use of B-2s in combat since Operation Odyssey Dawn in March 2011. After the B-2 strike is completed, U.S. MQ-9 Reaper unmanned aerial vehicles follow up with Hellfire air-to-ground missile strikes against surviving targets. Between them, the B-2s and MQ-9s kill an estimated 85 Islamic State personnel. The United States has conducted 495 airstrikes in and around Sirte since August 2016, most of them by unmanned aerial vehicles.

27 January
 The United States Department of Defense announces that United States Secretary of Defense James Mattis has ordered a review of the F-35 Lightning II program and the replacement for the Boeing VC-25 aircraft that operate as Air Force One. U.S. President Donald Trump's criticism of the costs of the two programs has prompted the review.

28 January
 Airline passengers around the world face confusion as airlines issue contradictory and vague rules about who can and cannot travel to the United States in the wake of U.S. President Donald Trump's executive order "Protecting the Nation from Foreign Terrorist Entry into the United States," signed on 27 January, which places a 90-day ban on entry to the United States of citizens of Iran, Iraq, Libya, Somalia, Sudan, Syria, and Yemen, an indefinite ban on entry by Syrian refugees, and a 120-day ban on entry by refugees from any other country.
 As part of a review of the U.S. strategy for defeating the Islamic State, the administration of President Donald Trump issues a memorandum to U.S. military commanders directing them to look into loosening restrictions on U.S. airstrikes imposed by President Barack Obama to lessen the likelihood and frequency of civilian casualties in U.S. airstrikes.

30 January
 U.S. President Donald Trump says that he has been able to get Lockheed Martin to agree to reduce the total price of the next batch of 90 F-35A Lightning II aircraft it will manufacture by US$600 million. A U.S. Department of Defense spokesman says that the reduction will amount to a per-plane price reduction of 6 to 7 percent, translating to a reduction of between US$6.1 million and US$7.1 million per plane and of between US$549 million and US$630 million for the 90 planes combined.

February

3 February
 The United States Department of Defense and Lockheed Martin announce a deal that reduces the contract cost for the next batch of F-35A Lightning II aircraft by US$728,000,000, bringing the contract to a total value of about US$8,900,000,000 and pushing the per-unit cost of the F-35 to under US$95,000,000 for the first time, a drop of 7.3 percent. Of the 90 aircraft, 55 are for the United States Air Force and 35 are for Australia, Israel, the United Kingdom, and other countries.

17 February
 With U.S. President Donald Trump in attendance, Boeing rolls out the newest version of its Boeing 787 Dreamliner airliner, the Boeing 787-10, in a ceremony at Charleston International Airport in South Carolina.

March
1 March
 In Geneva, Switzerland, a United Nations special investigative commission issues a finding that the Syrian government committed a war crime by deliberately bombing a humanitarian ground convoy unloading aid packages at a warehouse operated by the Syrian Arab Red Crescent west of Aleppo, Syria, during a ceasefire on 19 September 2016, killing 10 aid workers. The commission finds that the Syrian Arab Air Force strike was "meticulously planned and ruthlessly carried out." Both Russia and the Syrian government have denied that their aircraft conducted the attack.

2 March
 Manned and unmanned U.S. aircraft conduct 25 strikes against al Qaeda in the Arabian Peninsula (AQAP) targets in Yemen's Abyan, Bayda, and Shabwah governorates. One strike, against a car in the Mowjan area of Bayda Governorate, reportedly kills five AQAP members including some senior leaders, and local media claim that the strikes combine to kill "hundreds" of AQAP personnel.

2-3 March (overnight)
 U.S. manned and unmanned aircraft conduct at least five strikes against al-Qaeda in the Arabian Peninsula (AQAP) targets in Yemen. Among the targets is a house in the al-Saeed area of Shabwa Governorate believed to belong to senior AQAP area commander Saad Atef; his home is among several houses damaged by air-to-ground missiles, reportedly killing 12 AQAP personnel, although Atef's fate is unknown.

4 March
 Families of the passengers of Malaysian Airlines Flight 370 – a Boeing 777 with 239 people on board missing since 8 March 2014 – announce that they have begun a campaign to raise funds to pay for a private search for the plane, hoping to raise US$15 million for a search in a  area in the Indian Ocean to the north of previous search areas. Speaking at the remembrance event at a shopping mall near Kuala Lumpur, Malaysia, at which the families announce the new effort, Malaysian Minister of Transport Liow Tiong Lai claims that there is an 85 percent chance that the missing plane will be found in the new search area. The governments of Australia, the People's Republic of China, and Malaysia had called off their two-year, US$160 million search for the airliner on 17 January.
 A Syrian Arab Air Force MiG-23 (NATO reporting name "Flogger") crashes at the base of the Nur Mountains near Samandağ in Turkey's Hatay Province. Its pilot ejects, and Turkish authorities find him, injured and exhausted, after a nine-hour search. The Syrian government claims it crashed after experiencing technical difficulties during a mission over Syria near the Turkish border, while the Islamist group Ahrar al-Sham claims to have shot it down with a 23-millimeter antiaircraft gun while it was bombing targets in Syria's Idlib Governorate.

9 March
 United States Central Command's commander, United States Army General Joseph Votel, tells the United States Congress that an investigation has concluded that between four and 12 civilians died due to U.S. actions in a U.S. and United Arab Emirates ground and air raid in Yemen targeting al Qaeda in the Arabian Peninsula personnel on 29 January.
 In its quadrennial assessment of U.S. infrastructure, the American Society of Civil Engineers gives airports in the United States a grade of "D" on the American "A" through "F" scale, explaining that congestion at U.S. airports is growing and that it expects 24 of the largest airports to reach "Thanksgiving-peak traffic volume" at least one day a week by 2025. The grade is slightly below the D-plus the association gives U.S. infrastructure as a whole.

10 March
 A Swan Aviation Sikorsky S-76++ helicopter (registration TC-HEZ) making a domestic flight in Turkey from Istanbul Atatürk Airport to Bozüyük in heavy fog strikes the Endem TV Tower in Beylikdüzü, Istanbul, and crashes onto State Road D100, killing all seven people on board.

13 March
 Angry with the Government of the Netherlands over its refusal to allow Turkish diplomats to engage in political campaigning in the Netherlands among Turkish citizens there in support of a referendum in Turkey scheduled for 16 April 2017 that would increase the powers of Turkish President Recep Tayyip Erdoğan, as well as the treatment Turkish diplomats received from Dutch authorities while attempting to engage in such campaigning, the Government of Turkey announces a number of sanctions against the Netherlands, including the closing of Turkish airspace to Dutch diplomats. Among other things, the closing of the airspace prevents the Dutch ambassador to Turkey from returning to Turkey after a trip to the Netherlands.

14 March
 According to local residents, airstrikes against houses in Mosul, Iraq, targeting Islamic State snipers and other forces kill 27 civilians in one house and 19 in another.
 A Sikorsky S-92A helicopter (registration EI-ICR, call sign "Rescue 116") operated by CHC Helicopter under contract to the Irish Coast Guard crashes into the Atlantic Ocean during a rescue mission off County Mayo, Ireland, killing two crew members and leaving its other two crew members missing.

16 March
 Two U.S. MQ-9 Reaper unmanned aerial vehicles conduct an attack in Jinah, Syria, firing at least four AGM-114 Hellfire air-to-surface missiles and dropping at least one 500-pound (227-kilogram) bomb. The United States Department of Defense claims that the strike destroyed a partially completed community hall adjacent to a mosque and killed dozens of al-Qaeda personnel attending a meeting, while the Syrian Observatory for Human Rights and local activists claim that it destroyed the mosque itself and killed at least 46 people, most of them civilians.

17 March
According to local residents, an airstrike by the U.S.-led coalition against two Islamic State snipers in a building in Mosul, Iraq, kills a reported 137 people sheltering in one building. The coalition will later respond that it is investigating conflicting allegations of an airstrike in the area between 17 and 23 March that inflicted civilian casualties. The Iraqi armed forces neither confirm nor deny conducting a strike in the area, but say that the Islamic State is forcing civilians to remain in buildings while they fight coalition forces from the rooftops, hoping to turn world opinion against the coalition when airstrikes and other military operations targeting the Islamic State forces kill the civilians. A United States Department of Defense study of the incident released on 25 May 2017 will conclude that a 500-pound (227-kg) GBU-38 Joint Direct Attack Munition (JDAM) that struck the building detonated explosives stored there by the Islamic State, causing the building to collapse and killing the two snipers and 105 civilians, and that an additional 36 alleged civilian deaths in the explosion and collapse could not be confirmed; local residents will respond by disputing that explosives were stored in the building.
 Syria fires surface-to-air missiles (SAMs) at Israeli Air Force jets returning to Israel from an overnight strike against what Israel's Channel 10 says was a ground convoy in central Syria carrying weapons destined for Hezbollah. The Government of Syria claims that the Israelis targeted several sites in central Syria near Palmyra and that Syrian antiaircraft batteries shot down one Israeli plane, damaged another, and forced the rest to flee, but Israel says that the Syrian claims are false and that all its aircraft returned safely. Israel uses its Arrow missile in combat for the first time, shooting down one of the Syrian SAMs.
 An attack helicopter fires on a boat with 140 people on board carrying Yemeni refugees from Yemen to Sudan at the mouth of the Red Sea off the coast of Yemen, reportedly killing at least 40 people and injuring about 80 others. Houthi rebels in Yemen claim that an AH-64 Apache helicopter operated by the Saudi-led coalition fighting rebel forces in Yemen conducted the attack. The coalition has claimed that the Houthis smuggle weapons into Yemen via the Red Sea.
 Two Cessna 152s (registration C-FGOI and C-GPNP), each carrying a pilot from China flying solo, collide over Saint-Bruno-de-Montarville, Quebec, Canada, and crash on the grounds of the Promenades Saint-Bruno shopping mall. C-FGOI crashes into the mall's parking lot, killing its pilot, while C-GPNP crashes onto the mall's roof, seriously injuring its pilot.

18 March
 A 39-year-old man assaults a police officer during a traffic stop for speeding in the northeastern suburbs of Paris, hijacks a woman's car at gunpoint, and drives to Paris Orly Airport, where he confronts a team of three soldiers of France's Sentinel anti-terrorism force. After he tackles a female member of the Sentinel team, seizes her assault rifle, and points it at the other two soldiers, the other two soldiers shoot and kill him. About 3,000 passengers are evacuated from Orly's south terminal, while those in the airport's west terminal are confined temporarily. All air traffic into Orly also is suspended temporarily.

19 March
 A U.S. unmanned aerial vehicle carries out an air-to-ground missile strike in Afghanistan's Paktika Province that kills al-Qaeda leader Qari Yasin and three of his companions. The U.S. Department of Defense will announce the strike and its results on 25 March.

20 March
 A South Supreme Airlines Antonov An-26 crashes on landing at Wau Airport in South Sudan and is destroyed by fire. All 45 people on board survive, although 18 are injured.

21 March
 The U.S.-led coalition conducts 19 airstrikes against Islamic State targets in Syria's Raqqa Governorate near Ar-Raqqa. Local residents, activists, and Syrian state television report that one of the strikes hit a school in Mansoura where hundreds of civilians had taken shelter, killing at least 30 civilians. The coalition responds that it has no reports of civilian casualties resulting from its strikes.
 A spokesman for Raqqa is Being Slaughtered Silently says that airstrikes by the U.S.-led coalition targeting the Islamic State have killed 101 civilians since 1 March, a record death toll for a single month.
 Unidentified aircraft, either of the Syrian Arab Air Force or Russian Federation Air Force, strike Idlib, Syria, in response to an unexpected rebel offensive in the area. The offensive begins following days of strikes by Syrian Arab Air Force aircraft, supported by Russian planes, against rebel-held areas in Syria's Idlib Governorate that have killed dozens of civilians.
Such devices are permitted aboard the arriving airliners only as checked baggage or if brought aboard by crew members. Cell phones are allowed in the cabin. The US Department of Homeland Security (DHS) posted online a Q&A addressing the basic questions regarding Aviation Security Enhancements for Flights to the United States. A few hours later, the British government institutes the same ban on devices, but applies it to direct AtlasGlobal, British Airways, EasyJet, Egyptair, Jet2.com, Middle East Airlines, Monarch Airlines, Pegasus Airlines, Royal Jordanian, Thomas Cook Airlines, Thomson Airways, Saudia, Tunis Air, and Turkish Airlines flights arriving in the United Kingdom from Egypt, Jordan, Lebanon, Saudi Arabia, Tunisia, and Turkey.

22 March
 China warns a Guam-based United States Air Force B-1B Lancer bomber taking part in training exercises with South Korean forces over the East China Sea that it is operating without permission in the Chinese East China Sea Air Defense Identification Zone. The bomber's crew informs the Chinese that its aircraft is operating in international airspace and continues its mission without deviating from its flight path.
 United States Marine Corps aircraft including helicopters airlift Syrian Democratic Forces troops, including Arab and Kurdish forces, to an area behind Islamic State lines in northern Syria to spearhead an offensive to capture Al-Thawrah, Syria, the Tabqa Dam, and a nearby airfield from the Islamic State, the first time the United States has provided airlift support to rebels in Syria. U.S. Marine Corps AH-64 Apache attack helicopters are among other U.S. military forces also taking part in the offensive.
 The United Kingdom-based group Airwars alleges that airstrikes by the U.S.-led coalition in Iraq and Syria have killed 1,000 civilians since 1 March.

24 March
 A night airstrike probably conducted by Syrian Arab Air Force aircraft hits a rebel-operated women's prison in Idlib, Syria, killing at least 16 people, including prison staff and prisoners. Some of the imprisoned women reportedly survive the air raid and try to take advantage of the strike to escape from the prison but are shot to death by prison guards.

25 March
 During an ongoing rebel offensive, Syrian Arab Air Force aircraft conduct airstrikes against rebel forces and rebel-held areas in the suburbs of Damascus, Idlib Governorate, and Hama Governorate. Some activists claim that Russian aircraft also take part in the strikes. One strike hits a main street in Hamouriyah, killing at least 16 people – one report puts the death toll at at least 18 – and wounding more than 50. In Idlib Governorate, strikes hit the provincial capital, Idlib, and several other towns and villages, reportedly killing and wounding dozens of people; one of the strikes hits a clinic in Kafr Nabl.

26 March
The Islamic State had held the strategically important air base since capturing it in August 2014.
 Attack helicopters and artillery support Kenyan ground troops in a raid in Somalia's Badhadhe District that the Government of Kenya claims results in the death of 31 al-Shabaab personnel. Al-Shabaab denies that Kenya conducted the raid.

27 March
 A spokesman for United States Central Command announces that the U.S. military is not considering changes to its airstrike policies in combating the Islamic State in Iraq and Syria despite reported increases in civilian deaths due to U.S. strikes. United States Secretary of Defense James Mattis says that no country does more than the United States to avoid civilian casualties, adding, "We go out of our way to always do everything humanly possible to reduce the loss of life or injury among innocent people. The same cannot be said for our adversaries, and that is up to you [i.e., the press] to sort out."

28 March
 The United Kingdom-based group AirWars announces that of 1,257 claimed civilian deaths in Iraq and Syria in airstrikes by the U.S. coalition since 1 March, it considers a record 337 of them to be "fair," which it defines as corroborated by at least two generally reliable sources and alleged to have taken place in areas where coalition airstrikes are known to have occurred at the time of the reported civilian deaths.
 Peruvian Airlines Flight 112, a Boeing 737-3M8 (registration OB-2036-P), suffers the collapse of all three of its landing gear legs upon landing at Francisco Carle Airport in Jauja, Peru, slides off the runway, striking the airport's perimeter fence, and is destroyed by fire. All 150 people on board survive, but 39 suffer injuries.

29 March
 The largest variant of the Embraer E-Jet E2 family, the E195-E2, makes its first flight. The flight, previously scheduled for the second half of 2017, takes place ahead of schedule.
 The United States Department of State informs the United States Congress that it supports the sale of 19 F-16 Fighting Falcon fighter aircraft and related equipment to Bahrain, a deal worth US$5,000,000,000. The announcement reverses an autumn 2016 position that the State Department took which required that Bahrain improve its human right record as a condition of the sale.

30 March
 The first successful launch and landing of a used orbital rocket takes place as the first stage of a SpaceX Falcon 9 space launch vehicle returns to a soft landing aboard a platform in the Atlantic Ocean after launching a communications satellite from Cape Canaveral, Florida. SpaceX previously had used the rocket in an April 2016 launch.

31 March 
 The A319neo, the smallest variant of the Airbus A320neo family, makes its first flight, powered by CFM International LEAP engines.
 The Antonov/Taqnia An-132, an improved version of the Antonov An-32 twin-turboprop military transport aircraft, makes its maiden flight.
 The Boeing 787-10, the largest variant of the Boeing 787 Dreamliner, makes its first flight.

April

3 April
 During a counteroffensive by Syrian government forces to retake areas lost to rebels in March, Syrian aircraft conduct airstrikes against rebel-held areas around Damascus and in Hama, Syria. A strike in Douma reportedly kills at least 16 people.

4 April
 During heavy air raids against Tahrir al-Sham-held Khan Shaykhun, Syria, an attack with chemical weapons takes place, killing at least 86 people, the deadliest use of chemical weapons in the Syrian Civil War since 2013. U.S. President Donald Trump blames the Syrian Arab Air Force for the chemical attack, but the Syrian government denies involvement in the airstrikes and that it conducted a chemical attack. The following day, a spokesman for the Russian Ministry of Defense blames Syrian rebels, claiming that Syrian Arab Air Force strikes hit a rebel chemical weapons workshop, causing the release of poison gas, but offers no evidence to support the claim.
 Boeing announces a tentative agreement to sell 30 Boeing 737 MAX airliners to Iran's Iran Aseman Airlines for a total of US$3,000,000,000, with the airline also holding rights to purchase an additional 30 Boeing 737 MAX aircraft for an additional US$3,000,000,000. Deliveries are to begin in 2022.

5 April
The company envisions electric aircraft capable of seating 10 to 50 passengers that would operate at lower speeds and altitudes than current commercial aircraft but allow airlines to operate profitably from local airports that had lost airline service as airlines consolidated passengers onto larger aircraft to save on operating costs. The company also envisions the new generation of aircraft drawing people away from cars, buses, and trains by allowing airlines to offer lower fares and by operating from general aviation airports with passengers loading their baggage into the planes directly from their cars without going through time-consuming security lines or having to change planes at airline hubs. Zunum Aero hopes its aircraft can begin service by the early 2020s, although some independent observers doubt that such service could begin before 2030 and perhaps not before 2050.

6 April
 During the evening, the United States Navy guided-missile destroyers  and  fire 59 Tomahawk cruise missiles at the Syrian Arab Air Force's Shayrat Air Base, which the United States has identified as the source of the 4 April poison gas attack on Khan Shaykhun, Syria. Reports of the number of Syrian aircraft destroyed in the strike range from "approximately 20 planes" according to initial U.S. assessments to nine aircraft according to Russian state television. The Syrian state media report that nine civilians die in the strike, but the United States replies that the strike did not target civilians, instead hitting "aircraft, hardened aircraft shelters, petroleum and logistical storage, ammunition supply bunkers, air defense systems, and radars." According to the Syrian Observatory for Human Rights, the strike kills four Syrian military personnel, including a general, and damages over a dozen hangars, a fuel depot, and an air defense base, while Al-Masdar News reports that the strike kills six Syrian military personnel, damages or destroys 15 Syrian jet aircraft, and causes explosions and large fires when by destroying several fuel tankers. It is the first time that U.S. forces have attacked Syrian forces deliberately since the Syrian Civil War began in March 2011.

7 April
 Syrian Arab Air Force aircraft resume operations from Shayrat Air Base.
 In response to the U.S. cruise missile strike against Shayrat Air Base the previous day, Russia suspends its agreement to cooperate with the United States in avoiding hostile encounters with one another over Syria. It also claims that only 23 of the 59 missiles fired had hit their targets, and that they had destroyed only six Syrian aircraft – all MiG-23s (NATO reporting name "Flogger") undergoing repairs – a radar station, and a few buildings.
 The U.S.-led coalition has conducted at least 20 strikes against Islamic State targets in Syria over the previous 24 hours.

8 April
 Syrian Arab Air Force and Russian Federation Air Force aircraft strike targets in rebel-held areas in Syria's Aleppo, Damascus, Daraa, and Idlib governorates, killing civilians in all four governorates. During the day, Syrian aircraft again strike Khan Shaykhun, the site of the 6 April chemical attack, using only conventional weapons, killing one woman and wounding several other people there.

9 April
 After no one volunteers to give up his or her seat to make room aboard overbooked United Express Flight 3411 – an Embraer 170 with 70 passengers aboard operated by Republic Airline boarding at O'Hare International Airport in Chicago, Illinois, for a flight to Louisville, Kentucky – to make room for four United Airlines employees requiring transportation to Louisville, United employees select four passengers to be involuntarily bumped from the flight. Three comply, but the fourth, David Dao, refuses. After United employees deem Dao "disruptive" and "belligerent," Chicago Department of Aviation security officers board the plane, slam a screaming Dao's head against an armrest, and drag him from his seat, apparently unconscious. After the United employees take the vacated seats, Dao reboards the airliner with a bloody face, collapses, and is removed on a stretcher. The incident is captured on video and causes outrage. Although United chief executive officer Oscar Munoz initially defends his employees' actions, he apologizes two days later and promises such an incident will not occur again.

10 April
 The U.S. Federal Communications Commission (FCC) drops its 2013 proposal to allow passengers to use cellphones during the cruise portion of airline fights. Although then-FCC Chairman Tom Wheeler had argued in 2013 that advances in flight communications had minimized the danger of cellphone signals interfering with pilot radios, making prohibitions on cellphone use at cruising altitude unnecessary, although cellphone use during takeoff, climb, descent, and landing would remain prohibited. Wheeler's proposal has never been instituted, and current FCC Chairman Ajit Pai withdraws it, arguing that noisy telephone calls aboard airliners would annoy passengers and cabin crews.
 Researchers at Wichita State University and Embry-Riddle Aeronautical University release an annual report on the quality of the performance of airlines in the United States which finds – based on statistics compiled by the United States Department of Transportation regarding airline on-time performance, baggage-handling, involuntary bumping of passengers from oversold flights, and passenger complaints filed with the United States Government – that U.S. airlines improved their on-time performance (defined by the U.S. Government as arriving no more than 14 minutes late) in 2016 compared to 2015 and lost fewer pieces of luggage, and that customers filed fewer complaints in 2016 than in 2015, despite popular opinion that the quality of airline service is declining. On-time performance rose from 79.9 percent in 2015 to 81.4 percent in 2016 (with only American Airlines, JetBlue, and Virgin America seeing drops in performance among 12 leading U.S. airlines); lost, stolen, or delayed luggage dropped 17 percent; the bumping of passengers dropped 18 percent; and complaints to the U.S. Government dropped by about one-fifth (with only Hawaiian Airlines and Virgin America seeing increases in complaints). Overall, the researchers rank Alaska Airlines as the highest performer and Delta Air Lines second, and Frontier Airlines as the lowest performer, with Spirit Airlines second-lowest. The statistics do not include delayed flights that arrive within 14 minutes of their scheduled arrival time, passengers who voluntarily give up their seats on overbooked flights in exchange for compensation, or complaints filed directly with airlines.

11 April
  An air-to-ground missile strike by a U.S. unmanned aerial vehicle near Al-Thawrah, Syria, kills 18 members of the U.S.-backed Syrian Democratic Forces after they are mistaken for Islamic State personnel.

 13 April
 The United States uses a 22,000-pound (9,979-kg) GBU-43/B Massive Ordnance Air Blast (MOAB) in combat for the first time, dropping it from the rear cargo door of a United States Air Force Lockheed MC-130 on a cave complex of the Islamic State of Iraq and the Levant–Khorasan Province near the village of Moman in Achin District in Afghanistan's Nangarhar Province. The strike reportedly kills up to 36 ISIL-Khorasan Province members. The MOAB becomes the largest non-nuclear aerial bomb ever used in combat.
 A Lesotho Defence Force Eurocopter EC135 T2+ carrying three soldiers and a Lesotho Ministry of Finance official delivering pensions to outlying districts strikes power lines and crashes in mountainous terrain near Thaba Putsoa, Lesotho. Two of those on board are killed; the other two are critically injured and die later in a hospital.
 The largest variant yet of the Boeing 737 MAX, the Boeing 737 MAX 9, makes its first flight, taking off from Renton Municipal Airport in Renton, Washington, and landing at Boeing Field in Seattle, Washington, after a flight of 2 hours 42 minutes. It is due to enter service in 2018.

18 April
 A Saudi Arabian military Black Hawk helicopter crashes in Yemen's Ma'rib Governorate, killing 12 Saudi military personnel. Some reports blame the crash on "friendly fire."
 Flying in adverse weather, a Turkish police helicopter carrying seven police officers, a judge, a soldier, and three crew members crashes in mountainous terrain ten minutes after takeoff from Pulumur in eastern Turkey, killing all 12 people on board.

20 April
 Leased by GECAS, the first A321neo is delivered in Hamburg, Germany, to Virgin America, configured with 184 seats and LEAP engines. Virgin America expects to place it in service on 31 May.
 AeroMobil s.r.o. unveils the production model of its AeroMobil flying car at Top Marques Monaco in Monte Carlo, Monaco, and announces that it plans to begin to take preorders for the vehicle before the end of 2017.

22 April
 According to a Syrian Observatory for Human Rights report, airstrikes – presumably conducted by the Syrian Arab Air Force or Russian Federation Air Force – hit an underground medical center in Abdin, Syria. The Observatory later also reports that land-based missiles hit the facility. The attacks kill at least three medical staff members.

25 April
 The Turkish Air Force strikes Syrian Kurdish and Iraqi Kurdish targets, hitting what the Government of Turkey claims are "terrorist hotbeds" and Kurdistan Workers' Party (PKK) supply routes used to smuggle ammunition, explosives, and weapons into Turkey. In Syria, the strikes kill 20 members of the U.S.-backed Kurdish People's Protection Units (YPG). In Iraq, Turkish aircraft strike the Mount Sinjar area for the first time, hitting targets associated with the PKK's Yazidi affiliate and killing five Kurdish peshmerga troops. The United States Department of State and the Government of Iraq condemn the strikes, which Turkey did not coordinate with the U.S.-led coalition fighting the Islamic State in Syria and Iraq.
 Uber announced plans to launch a flying taxi service called Elevate using extremely quiet, pilotless, autonomous, electric-powered VTOL vehicles capable of carrying four passengers, with takeoffs and landings to take place at "vertiports" located in large cities, perhaps on the tops of buildings. Uber hopes that Elevate will begin operations by 2023 and perhaps as soon as 2020, followed by a full-scale rollout by 2027. Dallas, Texas, has already committed to hosting the initial Elevate operations, and Uber hopes that Dubai also will participate when Elevate is introduced. Uber has approached Aurora Flight Sciences, Bell Helicopter, Embraer, the Mooney International Corporation, and Pipistrel for designs for the proposed VTOL vehicle.

26 April
 China launches its first domestically built aircraft carrier, a Type 001A aircraft carrier reportedly to be named Shandong. Plans call for the carrier to enter service sometime around 2020 as the second aircraft carrier in China's history.

27 April
 Israeli Air Force jets flying over the Israeli-occupied Golan Heights fire several air-to-ground missiles at a Syrian military site used by Iranian militia forces just southwest of Damascus International Airport in Damascus, Syria. The strike, which apparently targets a shipment of arms that had arrived aboard at least three Iranian cargo aircraft earlier in the day, damages a warehouse and fuel depot results in a large explosion and fire.
 An Israeli Patriot surface-to-air missile hits what Israel initially reports is a "projectile" inbound from Syria over the Golan Heights. An Israeli spokesman later identifies the "projectile" as an unmanned aerial vehicle, either Syrian or Russian.
 Syrian or Russian air raids against rebel-held areas of Syria's Idlib Governorate kill at least 19 people. The strikes, which appear to target ambulances and medical facilities, kill four medical staff at a university hospital in Deir Sharqi and four paramedics or ambulance operators in Maarzita.
 Honolulu International Airport in Honolulu, Hawaii, is renamed Daniel K. Inouye International Airport.

29 April
 An airstrike by unidentified aircraft in rebel-held Kfar Zeita, Syria – an area where Syrian Arab Air Force and Russian Federation Air Force aircraft are operating against rebel forces – strikes an office of Syrian Civil Defense, also known as the "White Helmets" – killing eight members of the group. It is one of the deadliest strikes to dare against White Helmet personnel.
 Activists report heavy airstrikes by Syrian and/or Russian aircraft against the rebel-held Qaboun neighborhood in eastern Damascus, Syria.
 Two days of operations against Islamic militants in the Foulsare forest in Mali's Gao Region by French military forces as part of Operation Barkhane begin with strikes by French Air Force Dassault Mirage 2000 jet fighters against supply depots.
 An Aerogaviota Antonov An-26 crashes into the mountain Loma de la Pimienta near Candelaria, Cuba, killing all eight people – all members of the Cuban Revolutionary Armed Forces – on board.
 Boeing files a dumping petition at the United States International Trade Commission for the sale of 75 Bombardier CSeries CS100 to Delta Air Lines at $19.6m each, below their $33.2m production cost.

30 April
 The United States Department of Defense releases a statement saying that airstrikes the U.S.-led coalition conducted against the Islamic State in Iraq and Syria during March killed 45 civilians, mostly in and around Mosul, Iraq.
 Two days of French military operations against Islamic militants in the Foulsare forest in Mali's Gao Region as part of Operation Barkhane conclude. French airstrikes have supported the operations, in which French forces have killed or captured 20 militants.

May
1 May
 SpaceX uses its reusable Falcon 9 rocket to launch a U.S. national security payload for the first time, launching the National Reconnaissance Office's NROL-76 satellite into orbit from the Kennedy Space Center at Cape Canaveral, Florida. The Falcon 9's reusable first stage returns for a successful soft landing. The launch had originally been scheduled for 30 April, but had been postponed due to what SpaceX describes as a "sensor issue."
 Human Rights Watch issues a report stating that the Government of Syria has used chemical weapons in 12 separate attacks in rebel-held areas of Syria since December 2016, including the use of nerve agents in four of the attacks. The report finds that three of the nerve-agent attacks – two on 12 December 2016 and one on 30 March 2017 – occurred in Hama Governorate and the fourth on 4 April 2017 at Khan Shaykhun in Idlib Governorate. The report finds that the Khan Shaykhun attack killed at least 90 people and employed sarin delivered by a Russian-made aerial bomb – either a KhAB-250 or KhAB-500 – and that the Syrian government's use of helicopters to drop chlorine gas munitions, which began no later than 2014, has become "more systematic."

3 May
After the pilot learns from ground control of the skydiver's entanglement, he circles over the airfield for nearly an hour to burn fuel, before landing on a grass runway covered with firefighting foam to lessen the impact of the landing on the skydiver. Although dragged along the ground for  when the plane lands, the skydiver suffers only minor injuries.
 Airlink makes the first commercial airline flight with paying passengers in history to Saint Helena in the South Atlantic Ocean, a charter flight from Cape Town, South Africa, via Moçâmedes, Angola, to Saint Helena Airport using an Avro RJ85 to pick up passengers stranded when the island's only link with the outside world, the British Royal Mail Ship RMS St Helena, suffers propeller damage. The flight returns to Cape Town the same day with a stop at Windhoek, Namibia. No commercial airliner lands at Saint Helena Airport again until October, when Airlink begins the first scheduled commercial airline service in the island's history.

4 May
One United States Navy SEAL dies in the ensuring firefight.

5 May
 At Shanghai Pudong International Airport in Shanghai, China, before a crowd of 3,000 people, the first modern Chinese passenger jet, the Comac C919 (registration B-001A), makes its first flight, carrying five pilots and engineers. The airliner is intended to compete with the Boeing 737 and Airbus A320. Comac plans a test program of 4,200 flight hours before China Eastern Airlines introduces the C919 into service in 2019.

6 May
 A renewable six-month agreement between Iran, Russia, and Turkey establishing "de-escalation zones" in four rebel-held areas of Syria – a "Zone 1" consisting of Idlib Governorate and portions of northeastern Latakia Governorate, western Aleppo Governorate, and northern Hama Governorate; a "Zone 2" that covers an enclave in northern Homs Governorate; a "Zone 3" in eastern Ghouta north of Damascus; and a "Zone 4" in parts of Deraa Governorate and Quneitra Governorate along the border with Jordan – goes into effect, providing for the cessation of hostilities in the zones and the delivery of humanitarian aid to civilians in the zones. Under the agreement, the Syrian Arab Air Force will refrain from flying over the zones. The Russian Federation Air Force will continue to fly over them, but will not conduct airstrikes in them except against the Islamic State and al-Qaeda-linked groups. Russian officials indicate that at least another month will pass before maps detailing the boundaries of the de-escalation zones are issued and the de-escalation zones can come fully into force. Russia orders U.S. aircraft to stay out of the de-escalation zones, but the United States replies that the zones will not hinder it from striking Islamic State targets, and the United States and Russia resume use of a hotline to deconflict their air operations over Syria.
 Syrian attack helicopters drop three barrel bombs on rebel-held al-Lataminah, Syria.

10 May
 Five days before it is scheduled to make its first delivery of its new Boeing 737 MAX airliner to a customer, Boeing halts test flights and grounds the aircraft due to quality problems in a large metal disc used in the low-pressure turbine at the rear of the aircraft's CFM International LEAP-1B engines.

15 May
His son, grandson, great-grandson, and great-granddaughter also jump. Making the jump to raise money to benefit The Royal British Legion, Hayes breaks the previous record set by Armand Gendreau, who made a skydiving jump on 27 June 2014 at the age of 101 years three days.

16 May
 The first Boeing 737 MAX, a 737 MAX 8, is delivered to Malindo Air, which plans to debut it in revenue service.
 Canada's Minister of Transport, Marc Garneau, announces a new airline passenger "bill of rights" that includes new regulations prohibiting airlines from removing passengers involuntarily from overbooked flights, requiring them instead to offer a minimum level of compensation for voluntarily giving up their seats and then increasing that compensation until enough passengers accept it and leave their seats voluntarily. The new regulations, which also set minimum compensation levels for damaged baggage, will apply to all domestic flights in Canada and to international flights arriving in or departing from the country. The Canadian Parliament is expected to pass legislation approving the new regulations, which also include an increase in the cap on foreign ownership of Canadian airlines from 25 to 49 percent, and the Ministry of Transport plans to put them into effect in 2018.

18 May
 Two Chinese Sukhoi Su-30 (NATO reporting name "Flanker-C") aircraft intercept a United States Air Force WC-135 Constant Phoenix radiation detection plane flying over the East China Sea. The U.S. military describes the interception as "unprofessional" because of the speed, maneuvers, and proximity to the WC-135 of the Chinese aircraft, while Chinese officials respond that the interception was safe and professional and that the United States should refrain from conducting intelligence and surveillance flights near China.
At the time of the strike, the convoy, operated by Syrian and Iraqi militiamen, is advancing despite Russian efforts to dissuade them from coming closer to the U.S. ground forces. The strike destroys four or five construction vehicles and a tank, apparently killing the vehicles' occupants. One report places the number of dead militiamen at eight.
 King Willem-Alexander of the Netherlands reveals that he secretly has served as a copilot twice monthly aboard KLM CityHopper's Fokker 70 airliners for 21 years and that prior to that he had piloted airliners for Martinair. He also reveals that he is undergoing training to fly Boeing 737 aircraft, with which KLM CityHopper plans to replace its Fokker 70 fleet. Willem-Alexander, who has been a pilot for 30 years, says that the flights allow him to decompress from his royal duties.

19 May
 At Los Angeles International Airport in Los Angeles, California, a Turkish man, 25-year-old Anil Uskanli, is arrested when he opens a door that leads to an airport ramp. He is charged with misdemeanor trespassing and allowed to board American Airlines Flight 31, an Airbus A321 with 187 people aboard bound for Honolulu, Hawaii. Halfway through the flight, he becomes disruptive, attempting to move from economy class to first class and pushing a drink cart when a flight attendant uses it to block him from entering the first-class cabin. Passengers and crew members overpower him and restrain him by taping him to his seat with duct tape. Two F-22 Raptor jet fighter aircraft escort the airliner to Daniel K. Inouye International Airport in Honolulu, where Uskanli is arrested.

20 May
 The United States announces an arms deal with Saudi Arabia consisting of an immediate sale of $110,000,000,000, including $750 million for training of the Royal Saudi Air Force and $500 million for precision-guided munitions – including Paveway II laser-guided bombs and Joint Direct Attack Munition (JDAM) kits for unguided bombs – as well as an additional $350,000,000,000 in arms sales through 2027.
 Shortly after landing at Los Angeles International Airport in Los Angeles, California, after a flight from Mexico City, Mexico, Aeroméxico Flight 642, a Boeing 737-800 with 146 or 149 people (sources vary) on board, strikes a supply truck on a service road. The truck overturns, injuring all eight people in it, two of them seriously. The airliner suffers damage to its wing but no injuries to its passengers or crew.

23 May
 The United States Court of Appeals for the District of Columbia Circuit strikes down U.S. Federal Aviation Administration (FAA) rules issued in October 2015 and put into effect in January 2016 requiring the registration of all recreational unmanned aerial vehicles (commonly called "drones") in the United States that weigh more than one-half pound (0.23 kg). In an opinion dated 19 May 2017, the court finds that "The 2012 FAA Modernization and Reform Act provides that the FAA 'may not promulgate any rule or regulation regarding a model aircraft,' yet the FAA's 2015 Registration Rule is a 'rule or regulation regarding a model aircraft'...Statutory interpretation does not get much simpler." The court adds that the United States Congress would have to change or repeal the 2012 law before the FAA could regulate recreational UAVs. The ruling does not change registration requirements for commercial operators of UAVs, who still must register their UAVs. As of 23 May, there are 836,577 U.S. UAV registrations in the FAA's database, of which 764,830 are hobbyists given a single identification number to cover all the UAVs they own, the category of registrations affected by the court's decision; the remainder mostly are commercial UAVs that are registered individually and unaffected by the ruling.

24 May
U.S. officials claim that the Chinese interception was unsafe, with the Chinese aircraft flying to within  of the P-3 and cutting in front of it in a manner that prevented it from maneuvering safely.

25-26 May (overnight)
 Aircraft the Syrian Observatory for Human Rights identifies as being from the U.S.-led coalition strike Mayadin in Syria's Deir ez-Zor Governorate. The Observatory claims that the strikes hit a building housing the families of Islamic State personnel, the municipal building, the local power company, and a blood bank, killing 10 Islamic State personnel and dozens of civilians, including 42 children in the building housing Islamic State families. Rebel-linked local media claim that the strikes hit a market and that an air-to-ground missile landed between two hospitals. On 26 May, United States Central Command confirms that coalition aircraft conducted five strikes in Deir ez-Zor Governorate overnight, claiming that the strikes destroyed an Islamic State command and control node and an Islamic State headquarters.

26 May
 Iraqi military forces drop leaflets over Islamic State-held areas of Mosul, Iraq, warning residents to flee in advance of an offensive to retake the remainder of the city from the Islamic State.
 An airstrike in Mayadin, Syria, suspected of having been carried out by the U.S.-led coalition wounds the founder of the Islamic State's Amaq News Agency, Baraa Kadek, as well as his wife and daughter. Kadek will die of his wounds on 31 May. 
 Since the U.S.-led coalition began its air campaign against the Islamic State in 2014, the United States has conducted 8,700 strikes in Iraq and more than 8,500 strikes in Syria.
 Hours after an Islamic State attack on a bus carrying Coptic Christians in Egypt's Minya Governorate kills 29 people and wounds 24, Egyptian Air Force jets strike Islamic State targets in Derna, Libya.

27 May
 Philippine Air Force jets and Philippine military helicopters fire air-to-ground rockets at positions held by Abu Sayyaf forces besieging Marawi on Mindnanao in the Philippines. Civilian residents fly white flags in an effort to avoid being targeted by the airstrikes. Marawi has been under siege by Aby Sayyaf forces since 23 May.
The captain was killed on impact and the first officer died in hospital almost eight hours later. The third crew member received injuries and was evacuated to Kathmandu the following day after the weather had cleared. 
 Heavy airstrikes by the U.S.-led coalition support the beginning of an Iraqi offensive to take control of the portions of Mosul, Iraq, still held by the Islamic State.
 Egyptian Air Force jets strike Islamic State targets in Derna, Libya, for a second day.
 A major computer outage blamed on a power failure forces British Airways to cancel all flights at Heathrow Airport and Gatwick Airport in the London area. The outage prevents departures from and transfer between flights at the airports, disrupting flights worldwide. Although service will resume on 28 May, delays and cancellations will linger into 29 May.
28 May
 The U.S.-led coalition drops leaflets over ar-Raqqa, Syria, urging residents to leave the city before an offensive against the Islamic State there by the Syrian Democratic Forces.
 French military forces begin five days of operations against Islamic militants in Mali as part of Operation Barkhane. French Air Force Dassault Mirage 2000 and French Army Eurocopter Tiger attack helicopters support the operations.

29 May
 Aircraft of the U.S.-led coalition begin heavy airstrikes in ar-Raqqa, Syria, in support of an offensive by the Syrian Democratic Forces against Islamic State forces there. Raqqa is Being Slaughtered Silently claims that the coalition has conducted 30 airstrikes since 28 May, killing 35 people and destroying a school on the northern outskirts of ar-Raqqa.
 Egyptian Air Force jets again strike Islamic State targets in Derna, Libya.

30 May
 Part of Orlando International Airport in Orlando, Florida, is evacuated during an evening standoff between police and a mentally distressed man carrying a fake gun who demands to speak to President Donald Trump. The incident ends after almost three hours when the man surrenders peacefully.

31 May
 A Turkish Air Force Eurocopter AS532 Cougar helicopter carrying 13 Turkish Army personnel strikes high-tension power lines and crashes in Şırnak, Turkey, killing everyone on board. 
 The Scaled Composites Stratolaunch, an aircraft designed to launch rockets into space from high altitude, is rolled out of its hangar for the first time at Mojave Air and Space Port in Mojave, California. Its 385-foot (117-meter) wingspan is the largest in history.
 Since 1 March, the United Nations Human Rights Council's Independent International Commission of Inquiry on the Syrian Arab Republic has tallied 300 civilian deaths in Syria's Raqqa Governorate due to airstrikes by the U.S.-led coalition.

June
1 June
 French military forces conclude a five-day operation against Islamic militants in Mali as part of Operation Barkhane. French Air Force Dassault Mirage 2000 and French Army Eurocopter Tiger attack helicopters have supported the operations, which since they began on 28 May have killed 20 Islamic militants and captured munitions, weapons, and other equipment.

4 June
 Syrian Arab Air Force aircraft join Syrian Arab Army artillery in pounding rebel-held portions of Daraa, Syria, a day after rebel forces began attacks against Syrian government positions in the city.

6 June
 Aircraft of the U.S.-led coalition bomb Iranian-backed militia forces that have entered a restricted zone in southeastern Syria the United States has declared around a U.S. garrison at al-Tanf, Syria.

7 June

8 June
 After an Iranian-made Shahed 129 unmanned combat aerial vehicle (UCAV) drops a bomb near U.S.-backed Syrian rebels northeast of al-Tanf, Syria, a United States Air Force F-15E Strike Eagle shoots the UCAV down.
 Aircraft of the U.S.-led coalition bomb two armed pickup trucks that have entered a restricted zone in southeastern Syria that the United States has declared around a U.S. garrison at al-Tanf, Syria.

 9 June
 The United States International Trade Commission estimate the U.S. industry could be threatened by the Cseries dumping petitioned by Boeing as the U.S. Department of Commerce continue to conduct its investigations for initial reports in July 2017 and antidumping determination due in October 2017.

10 June
 During a telephone call between Russian Minister of Foreign Affairs Sergei Lavrov and United States Secretary of State Rex Tillerson, Lavrov tells Tillerson that Russia finds it unacceptable for aircraft of the U.S.-led coalition operating over Syria to strike Syrian government forces, as happened in May. Lavrov calls on Tillerson "to take concrete measures to prevent similar incidents in future."

11 June
 A U.S. airstrike on an al-Shabaab command and logistics camp near Sakow in Somalia's Middle Juba administrative region kills eight members of the group.
 China Eastern Airlines Flight 736, an Airbus A330 bound for Shanghai Pudong International Airport in Shanghai, China, suffers an engine failure about an hour after takeoff from Sydney Airport in Sydney, Australia. The plane flies safely back to Sydney.

13 June
 Kratos Defense & Security Solutions officially announces a new class of semiautonomous unmanned combat aerial vehicles (UCAVs) designed to operate as wingmen for manned fighter aircraft such as the F-16 Fighting Falcon and F-35 Lightning II. Kratos says the two UCAVs – the UTAP-22 Mako and the XQ-122 Valkyrie – already flown alongside manned fighters, will be exhibited at the Paris Air Show the following week, will undergo advanced testing over California's Mojave Desert in July 2017, and will take part in a "demonstrated military exercise" during the second half of 2017.

14 June
 Paulo Sérgio Pinheiro, chairman of the Independent International Commission of Inquiry on the Syrian Arab Republic, tells the United Nations Human Rights Council in Geneva, Switzerland, that the commission "...note[s]...that the intensification of airstrikes, which have paved the ground for an SDF (Syrian Democratic Forces) advance in Raqqa, Syria, has resulted not only in staggering loss of civilian life, but has also led to 160,000 civilians fleeing their homes and becoming internally displaced." An investigator for the commission, Karen Koning AbuZayd, adds that the commission counted 300 civilian deaths in coalition airstrikes in Syria's Raqqa Governorate between 1 March and 31 May.

15 June
Its lone occupant, the pilot, rides the blimp to the ground, suffers burns, and is transported to a hospital by a helicopter operated by Flight for Life.

16 June
 At Novosibirsk in Russia, an Ilyushin Il-2 Sturmovik makes its first flight since 25 November 1943, when it had made a forced landing on frozen Lake Krivoye near Murmansk in the Soviet Union while operating with the 46th Attack Air Regiment of the Soviet Navy's Northern Fleet Air Force. It had broken through the ice and sunk, but had been recovered in December 2011 and restored. It becomes one of only two flyable IL-2s.

18 June
 Airstrikes by the U.S.-led coalition target Islamic State positions in the Old City of Mosul, Iraq, as Iraqi forces begin an offensive to complete the recapture of Mosul from the Islamic State.
 After U.S. military jets fly low over Ja'Din, Syria, to deter fighting between forces loyal to the Syrian government and those of the Syrian Democratic Forces (SDF), a Syrian Arab Air Force Sukhoi Su-22 (NATO reporting name "Fitter") arrives and bombs the SDF positions. U.S. military forces use a "deconfliction channel" to coordinate operations with Russian military forces in Syria to avoid further escalation, after which a U.S. F/A-18 Super Hornet shoots down the Su-22 when it fails to respond to hailing attempts by U.S. aircraft. The Syrian armed forces report that the Su-22's pilot was killed and claims the Su-22 was attacking Islamic State positions, but United States Central Command counters that the area has been devoid of Islamic State forces for an extended period of time. It is the first time the United States has shot down a Syrian Arab Air Force aircraft during the Syrian Civil War and the first time in more than a decade that a U.S. aircraft has shot down a manned hostile aircraft.

19 June
 A Russian Sukhoi Su-27 (NATO reporting name "Flanker") fighter intercepts a U.S. Air Force Boeing RC-135 reconnaissance aircraft over the Baltic Sea, coming to within  of the RC-135. The United States Department of Defense says that the interception was "unsafe."
 Russia calls the U.S. downing of a Syrian Arab Air Force aircraft on 18 June a "flagrant violation of international law" and claims that it will view as targets any manned or unmanned aircraft of the U.S.-led coalition flying over Syria west of the Euphrates River while Russian Federation Air Force aircraft are operating over Syria. In addition, the Russian Ministry of Defence announces that Russia is suspending use of the communications channel between Russian and U.S.-led coalition forces intended to deconflict air operations between them.

20 June
 A U.S. Air Force F-15E Strike Eagle intercepts an Iranian-made Shahed 129 unmanned combat aerial vehicle (UCAV) over southeastern Syria as it approaches U.S.-backed Syrian rebels and their advisers northeast of al-Tanf, Syria. After attempts to get the UCAV to alter course fail, the F-15E shoots it down.
 Australia announces that it has suspended operations by its aircraft over Syria, moving its reconnaissance and tanker aircraft out of Syrian airspace, as the United States and other coalition members have done previously. Australian aircraft remain active over Iraq.
 Egyptian Air Force strikes in the northern Sinai Peninsula kill 12 members of the Islamic State of Iraq and the Levant – Sinai Province, as well as four ground vehicles.
 At the Paris Air Show, Boom Technology announces plans to develop a 45-passenger supersonic airliner capable of flying from New York City to London in 2½ hours, from San Francisco to Tokyo in 5½ hours, and from Los Angeles to Sydney in just under seven hours, in all three cases cutting current flight times in half. Boom hopes to have the new airliner – which will offer only first- and business-class seating – in service by no later than 2023 if it receives all required certifications. Boom also announces that Virgin Atlantic has ordered 10 of the airliners, four other airlines have ordered another 66, and that it will announce orders by an additional four airlines in the next few months.
 United Airlines Flight 1031, a Boeing 737 flying from Panama City, Panama, to Houston, Texas, encounters severe turbulence about 80 miles east of Cancún, Mexico. Between 10 and 15 people aboard the airliner suffer injuries, but it lands safely at Houston.

21 June
 After three Russian aircraft – a transport aircraft carrying Minister of Defence Sergei Shoigu escorted by two fighters – flying over the Baltic Sea fail to identify themselves or respond to air traffic control, a North Atlantic Treaty Organization (NATO) F-16 Fighting Falcon intercepts them, making a close approach to the transport. One of the escorting fighters, a Sukhoi Su-27 (NATO reporting name "Flanker") approaches the F-16 from behind and rocks its wings to show that it is armed, and the F-16 breaks off and departs the area.
 At the Paris Air Show, Boeing has received orders for or expressions of interest in ordering 370 aircraft worth $52,000,000,000 since 19 June, including a boost in interest in its Boeing 737 MAX 10 airliner. Airbus has posted sales of 229 airliners worth $25,000,000,000 at the show over the same period. The combined total of $77,000,000,000 in airliner deals passes the $50,000,000,000 in deals at the 2016 Farnborough Airshow in England.

22 June
 At Caldwell Industrial Airport in Caldwell, Idaho, Republic P-47 Thunderbolt 42-29150, named Dottie Mae by its primary World War II pilot, makes its first flight since 8 May 1945, when it had crashed into the Traunsee in Germany, the last P-47 lost in Europe during World War II. Recovered in June 2005 and restored, it becomes the only flyable P-47 with a combat record.

23 June
 N315DN, an Airbus A321-211(SL) operated by Delta Air Lines, is substantially damaged when it suffers a tail strike at Hartsfield–Jackson Atlanta International Airport in Atlanta, Georgia, during landing roll-out.

24 June
 After 10 projectiles from Syria go astray during fighting there and land in open areas of the Israeli-controlled portion of the Golan Heights, the Israeli Air Force responds with airstrikes that knock out two tanks and a heavy machine gun position in Syria. Syria reports that the strikes kill two people.

25 June
 Stray projectiles from Syria land in the Israeli-occupied Golan Heights for the second straight day, and the Israeli Air Force again responds with airstrikes against Syrian government military positions in Syria, hitting two artillery positions and an ammunition truck.

26 June
 In response to an Islamic State counteroffensive against Iraqi forces attempting to retake Mosul, Iraq, from the Islamic State, the U.S.-led coalition conducts 12 airstrikes which kill 40 Islamic State personnel.

27 June
 An elderly woman boarding a China Southern Airlines plane at Shanghai Pudong International Airport in Shanghai for a domestic flight in China to Guangzhou throws coins at the airliner to "pray for a safe flight." One of them goes into one of the plane's engines. Police detain but do not charge her. The flight is delayed for over five hours while the coin is extracted from the engine. 
 A police helicopter belonging to Venezuela's largest national police agency, the Cuerpo de Investigaciones Científicas, Penales y Criminalísticas ("Scientific, Penal and Criminal Investigation Service Corps") flies over the Venezuelan supreme court building in Caracas, Venezuela, carrying a sign reading "Libertad" ("Freedom") and "350," a reference to Article 350 of the Venezuelan constitution, which allows Venezuelans to disown their government if it behaves undemocratically. The Venezuelan minister of communications claims that the helicopter pilot drops four hand grenades, three of which explode, as it circles, prompting security forces of the government of Venezuelan President Nicolás Maduro to seal off government facilities. Later reports that the helicopter pilot is an actor with military special forces experience leads some Venezuelans to suggest that the flight was staged by the Maduro government to justify further crackdowns on dissent.

July

2 July
 An Indonesian National Search and Rescue Agency Eurocopter AS365 Dauphin helicopter dispatched to Dieng Plateau in Central Java, Indonesia, to evacuate people near the plateau's erupting Sileri Crater hits a cliff on Mount Butak in Central Java three minutes before arrival at Dieng Plateau and crashes, killing all eight people on board.
 A U.S. unmanned aerial vehicle strikes Al-Shabaab in Somalia, targeting an unidentified specific individual. 
 The United States Department of Homeland Security exempts Etihad Airways from the ban imposed in March 2017 on laptop computers and other electronic devices aboard flights to the United States originating from Abu Dhabi International Airport in the United Arab Emirates.
 An engine on United Express Flight 5869, a Bombardier CRJ700 operated by SkyWest Airlines, catches fire after landing at Denver in Denver, Colorado, at the end of a flight from Aspen-Pitkin County Airport in Aspen, Colorado. All passengers and crew members evacuate safely.
 Etihad Airways is exempted from the U.S. ban on large electronic devices.

3 July
 During the day, the U.S.-led coalition maintains an extremely high tempo of airstrikes in support of Iraqi ground forces fighting to complete the recapture of Mosul, Iraq, from the Islamic State.
 A masked man jumps a barbed-wire fence and attempts to hijack at gunpoint a Hillsboro Aero Academy helicopter at Hillsboro Airport in Hillsboro, Oregon, as it prepares for takeoff with an instructor and student on board. After firing a shot and ordering the pilot and student off the helicopter, the man is held at gunpoint by Hillsboro Aero Academy employees, then jumps from the helicopter without taking off when Hillboro police officers arrive. The police shoot and kill him in a field adjacent to the airport.

4 July
 Piloted by Lee Lauderback of the USAF Heritage Flight and bearing the World War II markings of the United States Army Air Forces′ 357th Fighter Group, the North American P-51B Mustang Berlin Express arrives at Duxford Aerodrome in England for the 25th annual Flying Legends air show. By arriving at Duxford, Louderback completes a six-day, 5,470-mile (8,808-km) recreation of a typical World War II ferry flight from Texas to England.

5 July
 Emirates and Turkish Airlines announce that they have been exempted from the U.S. ban on large electronic devices in airliner cabins.

6 July
 Qatar Airways is exempted from the U.S. ban on large electronic devices in airliner cabins.

7 July
 Operating from Anderson Air Force Base on Guam, two United States Air Force B-1B Lancer bombers accompanied by Republic of Korea Air Force F-15 Eagle fighters fly over South Korea and drop inert bombs on a practice range in northeastern South Korea in a show of force following a North Korean ballistic missile launch on 3 July. The B-1Bs then fly over the East China Sea accompanied by Japan Air Self-Defense Force Mitsubishi F-2 fighters before returning to Guam after 10 hours in the air.
 Aboard Delta Air Lines Flight 129, a Boeing 767-300 with over 200 people aboard bound from Seattle, Washington, to Beijing, China, a passenger attempts to open a cabin door in flight while the plane is flying over Vancouver Island about an hour after takeoff. He injures a flight attendant and another passenger who attempt to stop him before passengers and crew subdue and restrain him. The airliner returns to Seattle–Tacoma International Airport, where the man is arrested.
 In the evening, Air Canada Flight 759, an Airbus A320-211 carrying 135 people, nearly lands on a San Francisco International Airport taxiway occupied by four loaded airliners waiting for takeoff, spurring a U.S. National Transportation Safety Board investigation.

9 July
 Kuwait Airways and Royal Jordanian are exempted from the U.S. ban on large electronic devices in airliner cabins.

10 July
 Claiming that Kiev Airport has failed to honor an agreement with Ryanair to allow it to offer low-cost service there, Ryanair announces that it has cancelled plans to begin service to Ukraine.
 The United States Department of Defense announces that it is increasing its order for F-35 Lightning II fighters by 74 aircraft at an additional cost of US$5,570,000,000.
 An odor in the air conditioning system at a U.S. Federal Aviation Administration air traffic control facility in Leesburg, Virginia, forces a building evacuation that shuts down the facility for over three hours. The incident results in a ground stop for flights to and from Baltimore-Washington International Thurgood Marshall Airport in Baltimore, Maryland, Washington Dulles International Airport in Sterling, Virginia, and Ronald Reagan Washington National Airport in Arlington, Virginia. Normal flight operations do not resume at the three airports until the morning of 11 July.

12 July
 A 57-year-old woman visiting from New Zealand is fatally injured at Maho Beach on Sint Maarten when jet blast from a nearby airliner at Princess Juliana International Airport knocks her into a retaining wall. The beach is a popular tourist destination where visitors experience close-up views of takeoffs and landings from an adjacent runway and brave the effects of jet blast sweeping across the beach. The woman's death is the first fatality at the beach attributed to airliner operations.

13 July
 U.S. military forces in two helicopters assist Somali commandos in an attack on two al-Shabaab camps village of Kunya-Barrow in the Lower Shebelle administrative region of Somalia, one of them against a detention center. The raid kills several members of al-Shabaab.

15 July
 Benina International Airport in Benghazi, Libya, reopens for commercial flights. It had been closed to commercial traffic since 2014 because of fighting in the Second Libyan Civil War.

21 July
 A U.S. airstrike mistakenly hits an Afghan National Security Forces compound in the Nahri Saraj District in Afghanistan's Helmand Province, killing 12 Afghan National Police officers.

22 July
 Syrian Arab Air Force aircraft strike Islamic State positions in Maadan and Bir al-Sabkhawi in Syria's Raqqa Governorate.

23 July
 Two Chinese People's Liberation Army Air Force Chengdu J-10 (NATO reporting name "Firebird") fighters intercept a United States Navy Lockheed EP-3 reconnaissance plane over the East China Sea. One of them suddenly emerges in front of the EP-3, prompting the United States to complain to the Chinese armed forces that the J-10s maneuver was dangerous.
 U.S. forces conduct an airstrike in Somalia targeting al-Shabaab regional commander Ahmed Osoble. Initial reports indicate that Osoble died in the strike.
 The day after the Syrian armed forces declared a cessation of hostilities in the Eastern Ghouta area of Syria, Syrian Arab Air Force aircraft conduct six airstrikes on rebel-held Douma and Ein Tarma in Eastern Ghouta.

28 July
 In a case brought by the advocacy group Flyers Rights, the United States Court of Appeals for the District of Columbia Circuit issues an order for the U.S. Federal Aviation Administration to review shrinking airline seat sizes and legroom that Flyers Rights says have become too tight for the health and safety of airline passengers in the United States, exposing them to a greater likelihood of contracting dangerous ailments such as deep vein thrombosis and making emergency evacuations slower and more difficult. No aviation authority in the world has previously regulated airline seat size or legroom. Airlines argue that reducing seat size and legroom in economy class is necessary to ensure their profitability.

29 July
 Two men are arrested in Sydney, Australia, for plotting to place an improvised explosive device (IED) aboard an Etihad Airways flight in checked luggage at Sydney Airport on 15 July. The device had failed to get past airport security. A senior Islamic State.commander had sent the men the parts for the IED via air cargo from Turkey.
 A U.S. military unmanned aerial vehicle (UAV) hits a car driving near Tortoroow, Somalia, with an air-to-ground missile. On 31 July, United States Africa Command will announce the strike, saying that it killed an al-Shabaab member and harmed no civilians, and the Government of Somalia's Ministry of Information will identify the dead man as senior al-Shabaab commander Ali Mohamed Hussein.

30 July
 For the second time in July, two U.S. Air Force B-1 Lancer bombers from Anderson Air Force Base on Guam, accompanied by Republic of Korea Air Force fighters, fly over South Korea in a show of force following a North Korean ballistic missile launch on 28 July. The B-1s make a low pass over Seoul before returning to Guam.

August

1 August
 Minutes after Copa Airlines Flight 208 from Panama City, Panama, arrives at San Francisco International Airport in South San Francisco, California, a 17-year-old boy aboard as a passenger opens one of the airliner's emergency door and slides down the plane's wing to the tarmac. Police arrest him, and he is taken to a hospital for mental health treatment.

5 August
 Shortly before arriving at Philadelphia International Airport in Philadelphia, Pennsylvania, at the end of a flight from Athens, Greece, American Airlines Flight 759, an Airbus A330-300 with 299 people on board, encounters severe turbulence over the North Atlantic Ocean. Ten people are injured, but the airliner lands safely.

8 August
 An Iranian QOM-1 unmanned aerial vehicle (UAV) comes within  vertically and  laterally of a United States Navy Strike Fighter Squadron 147 (VFA-147) F/A-18E Super Hornet as the FA/-18E circles in preparation for a landing aboard the aircraft carrier   in the Persian Gulf, forcing the F/A-18E pilot to take evasive action to avoid a collision. United States Central Command issues a statement calling the UAV's operation "unsafe and unprofessional."
 The New England Patriots purchase two Boeing 767s at a cost of about US$10,000,000, reportedly becoming the first National Football League team to own its own aircraft. The Patriots make the purchase because American Airlines and Delta Air Lines are retiring aircraft capable of accommodating the entire team, and because the estimated annual cost of US$4,000,000 to fly the team to 10 road games makes owning jets an economically practical alternative.

9 August
It also flies over Camp David in Maryland, near Wright-Patterson Air Force Base in Ohio, and over the Trump National Golf Club in Bedminster, New Jersey, where President Donald Trump is vacationing.

12 August
 A United States Navy F/A-18E Super Hornet from Strike Fighter Squadron 146 aboard the aircraft carrier  in the Persian Gulf suffers an engine malfunction that forces its pilot to make an emergency landing at Bahrain International Airport in Bahrain. Unable to stop the plane after touching down, the pilot ejects before the jet leaves the runway and is uninjured. The crash-landing disrupts flights at the airport for several hours.

13 August
 For the second time in six days, an Iranian unmanned aerial vehicle (UAV) approaches the U.S. Navy aircraft carrier  while she conducts air operations in the Persian Gulf. The United States Fifth Fleet reports that the UAV "conducted an unsafe and unprofessional approach" to Nimitz and "created a dangerous situation with the potential for collision...not in keeping with international maritime customs and laws," making several passes in the evening darkness without navigation lights and coming to within  of U.S. Navy aircraft in flight.

 15 August
 Air Berlin, Germany's second largest airline, with 85 destinations, 8,000 employees, and 72 aircraft, files for bankruptcy.

 16 August
 The CASA C212-derived Indonesian Aerospace N-219 light aircraft makes its maiden flight in Bandung, Indonesia.
 The Australian Transport Safety Bureau releases an analysis of a 23 March 2014 satellite image taken two weeks after Malaysian Airlines Flight 370 disappeared, classifying 12 objects as "probably man-made".
 The United Nations High Commission for Refugees reports that the Saudi-led coalition has conducted 5,676 airstrikes in Yemen thus far in 2017, an increase over the 3,936 it conducted during all of 2016.

22 August
 The Syrian Observatory for Human Rights reports that it estimates that airstrikes by the U.S.-led coalition in Syria against Islamic State targets in support of the coalition's offensive to drive the Islamic State out of ar-Raqqa have killed 168 civilians since 14 August. The Syrian Network for Human Rights previously had reported that it estimated that the airstrikes had killed 458 civilians since June. Islamic State forces reportedly have been using civilians as human shields to deter airstrikes and undermine popular support for them.

23 August
 The Saudi-led coalition in Yemen conducts a series of predawn airstrikes around Sana'a. Yemen's Ministry of Health reports that most of the dead were khat farmers staying at the motel.
 The London-based monitoring group AirWars claims that at least 725 civilians have died since 6 June in airstrikes conducted by the U.S.-led coalition in Syria against Islamic State targets in support of the coalition's offensive to drive the Islamic State out of ar-Raqqa. Islamic State forces reportedly have been using civilians as human shields to deter airstrikes and undermine popular support for them.

30 August
 U.S. aircraft destroy a bridge and crater a road near Hamaymah, Syria, to prevent a convoy of buses carrying 310 Islamic State personnel from reaching Islamic State-controlled Bukamal, Syria; they do not strike the convoy itself because of the presence of noncombatant relatives of the Islamic State personnel aboard the buses, but as part of the strike do target several ground vehicles and individuals clearly identified as belonging to the Islamic State. The Islamic State personnel had been attempting to reach Bukamal under the terms of a Hezbollah-brokered agreement between the Islamic State and the Government of Syria for them to withdraw there from a besieged region along Syria's border with Lebanon. A U.S. military spokesman explains that the U.S.-led coalition will not allow the Islamic State personnel to reach Bukamal, both because that simply will reinforce Islamic State forces there and because "to relocate terrorists from one place to another for someone else to deal with is not acceptable to the coalition."

31 August
 A U.S. airstrike outside Barawa, Somalia, kills one member of al-Shabaab and wounds another. United States Africa Command will announce the strike on 1 September.

September
2 September
During one lap, Hinton sets an absolute world speed record for a C-1e-class piston-engine aircraft, reaching .

3 September
 Piloting the Windward Performance Perlan II, Jim Payne and Morgan Sandercock establish a new absolute glider world altitude record, reaching an altitude of  near El Calafate, Argentina.

5 September
 A U.S. airstrike in Somalia's Bay region kills three Al-Shabaab members who United States Africa Command has deemed a "credible threat" to nearby Somali Army and African Union forces. U.S. Africa Command will announce the strike on 6 September.

7 September
 Firing air-to-ground missiles from over Lebanon, Israeli Air Force jets strike a Syrian military facility near Masyaf, Syria, that military analysts believe is a center for producing unconventional weapons and precision-guided munitions. The Government of Syria claims that the strike kills two Syrian soldiers.

8 September
 The Russian Ministry of Defense claims that a Russian Federation Air Force strike against and underground bunker outside Deir ez-Zor, Syria, has killed 40 Islamic militants, including four senior commanders. It names Abu Muhammad al-Shimali and Gulmurod Khalimov as two of the four dead commanders.
 A Schweizer 269C helicopter (registration N2091E) crashes into a wooded area at Flying W Airport in Medford, New Jersey, killing both people on board, its pilot and country music star Troy Gentry.

14 September
Syrian activists say that intense missile and Russian Federation Air Force strikes against three Islamic State-held towns in eastern Syria's Euphrates River valley during the day have killed at least 20 civilians.

16 September
 The U.S.-led coalition claims that a Russian Federation Air Force strike during the morning struck positions in Syria's Deir ez-Zor Governorate held by the Syrian Democratic Forces.

18 September
 In a show of force prompted by a North Korean ballistic missile test on 15 September, two United States Air Force B-1B Lancer bombers, four United States Marine Corps F-35B Lightning II vertical and/or short take-off and landing (V/STOL) fighters, and four Republic of Korea Air Force F-15K Slam Eagle strike fighters fly across South Korea and release live weapons on a range in South Korea. The six U.S. aircraft also practice formation flying with Japan Air Self-Defense Force fighters over Kyushu, Japan, before returning to base.
 U.S. Air Force C-17 Globemaster III aircraft deliver the Afghan Air Force's first two UH-60 Black Hawk helicopters at Kandahar Air Base in Kandahar, Afghanistan. The helicopters are the first of a planned 159 Black Hawks that are to replace the Afghan Air Force's fleet of 45 Mil Mi-17 (NATO reporting name "Hip") helicopters, of which only 25 remain operational. Training of Afghan pilots is scheduled to begin in early October, and the last of the 159 Black Hawks is expected to arrive in Afghanistan in 2022, with 58 of them outfitted as attack helicopters. Since 2012, the United States has also provided the Afghan Air Force with 12 A-29 Super Tucano light attack aircraft, 24 MD 530F helicopters, and 24 Cessna C-208 cargo aircraft.

19 September
 A baggage handler at Singapore's Changi Airport is charged in court with 286 counts of criminal mischief for deliberately misdirecting airline luggage by swapping luggage tags between bags. He allegedly began the practice on 8 November 2016 and continued almost every day for three months until February 2017, misdirecting hundreds of bags on Lufthansa, SilkAir, and Singapore Airlines bound for destinations such as Hong Kong, Manila, London, and Perth, Australia.
 U.S. airstrikes support the beginning of an Iraqi offensive against Islamic State forces in Iraq's Anbar Governorate.
 Israeli Air Force fighters scramble to intercept an unmanned aerial vehicle (UAV) apparently operated by Hezbollah as it approaches Israeli-occupied territory in the Golan Heights, but an Israel Defense Forces Patriot surface-to-air missile shoots the UAV down without the jets engaging it. The UAV crashes near Quneitra, Syria.

22 September
United States Africa Command will announce the strikes on 24 September.

23 September
 U.S. Air Force B-1B Lancer bombers based on Guam escorted by U.S. Air Force F-15C Eagle fighters based on Okinawa fly over international waters in the Sea of Japan off the east coast of North Korea in a show of force. The flight is the farthest north of the Korean Peninsula's Demilitarized Zone by any U.S. fighters or bombers thus far in the 21st century.

24 September
 To put pressure on the Kurdistan Regional Government in Iraqi Kurdistan to call off a referendum on independence from Iraq scheduled for 25 September, the Government of Iraq orders it to – among other things – hand over control of all airports in Iraqi Kurdistan to Iraqi government authorities. In addition, Iran closes its airspace to flights to and from Iraqi Kurdistan, reportedly at the request of the Iraqi government.

25 September
 North Korean Minister of Foreign Affairs Ri Yong-ho says that remarks President Donald Trump made in a speech at the United Nations on 19 September and on Twitter on 23 September amount to a U.S. declaration of war on North Korea, and says that North Korea has "the right to shoot down United States strategic bombers even when they are not inside the airspace border of our country."
 The U.S. National Oceanic and Atmospheric Administration (NOAA) Gulstream IV-SP Gonzo (registration N49RF) – the only aircraft in the U.S. "hurricane hunter" fleet capable of high-altitude reconnaissance of hurricanes – is grounded for a 150-hour inspection after suffering a cabin door pressure seal failure while flying in Hurricane Maria. It is the aircraft's third aborted or scrubbed flight since 17 September, and the inspection may prevent it from flying again until 3 October. Its maintenance problems prompt concerns in the United States Congress that NOAA is failing to comply with an April 2017 law mandating that it acquire and maintain a second aircraft capable of high-altitude hurricane reconnaissance.

26 September
 Saying that the Kurdistan Region had made "a strategic and historic mistake" by holding a referendum on independence from Iraq on 25 September, Prime Minister of Iraq Haider al-Abadi orders local authorities to hand over control of all airports and borders in northern Iraq by 29 September or face the suspension of all international flights to and from the area.
 The United States Department of Commerce announces it found that following the Cseries dumping petition by Boeing, Bombardier Aerospace received subsidies of 220%, will collect deposits based on these preliminary rates and is scheduled to announce its final determination on 12 December 2017.
 The Boeing-funded group GoFly announces the GoFly Prize, a two-year, US$2,000,000 competition to develop a practical flying device for personal use. To win, the device must be simple to use, safe, able to take off and land vertically and fly  without recharging or refueling, and transportable by a single person without using a motorized vehicle, although use of a non-motorized device that can be pulled or pushed by a single person is permitted. In addition, the flying device must not submit its operator to "extreme sustained g forces greater than 5 g or dangerous impulses from hard landings." The flying device also must have back-ups for key systems in case those systems fail and must comply will all U.S. Federal Aviation Administration rules. In addition to a US$1,000,000 grand prize, the competition will award $250,000 prizes for the quietest and smallest devices and US$25,000 awards for the best-written plans.

27 September
 Insurgents using civilians as human shields attack Hamid Karzai International Airport in Kabul, Afghanistan, with mortar fire and suicide vests, prompting Afghan authorities to cancel all flights at the airport. At least 12, and perhaps as many as 30, high-explosive rockets land in and near the airport during the course of over six hours, and one of them strikes a house, killing one civilian and injuring 11 others. A U.S. airstrike in support of Afghan forces responding to the attack inadvertently also inflicts civilian casualties when a U.S. air-to-ground missile malfunctions. United States Secretary of Defense James Mattis had landed at the airport hours before the attack in a U.S. Air Force C-17 Globemaster III, but is not present during the attack.
 A week after Hurricane Maria struck Puerto Rico, thousands of travelers remain stranded at Luis Muñoz Marín International Airport in San Juan, which has only limited flight operations due to damage to the air traffic control system, the power grid, and the airport itself. American Airlines, which normally carries 3,000 outbound passengers on 20 flights per day, managed only three outbound flights on 22 September, and one outbound flight with 300 seats each day on 26 and 27 September. JetBlue is making six relief flights a day to deliver supplies to San Juan, and is selling seats on its outbound aircraft. Some charter flights are leaving San Juan, but charge as much as $1,200 for a seat on a flight to Miami, Florida.

29 September
 During a speech to the International Astronautical Congress in Adelaide, Australia, Elon Musk announces that he intends that his company SpaceX construct a fully reusable transportation system consisting of a large booster rocket and a spacecraft with more pressurized passenger space than an Airbus A380 capable of reaching low Earth orbit, the moon, and Mars and of transporting about 100 people anywhere on Earth within an hour, reaching speeds of almost, . Musk claims that the new transportation system could take passengers from New York City to Shanghai in 39 minutes and from New York City to London in 29 minutes.

30 September
 Airstrikes that begin on the evening of 29 September and continue into 30 September pound Islamic State-held areas in eastern Syria, including Boukamal, Bouleil, Bouomar, Mayadeen, and Mushassan, killing and injuring dozens of people. Estimates of the death toll range from at least 18 to at least 24. It is not immediately clear whether the Russian Federation Air Force or U.S.-led coalition is responsible for the strikes.
 Major General Igor Konashenkov, a spokesman for the Russian Ministry of Defense, claims that during the 10-day period between 19 and 28 September Russian air strikes killed 2,359 Islamic militants, including 400 from the post-Soviet states, and wounded about 2,700 others, and that 16 field commanders were among the dead and wounded. He also claims that Russian airstrikes destroyed 27 tanks, 21 rocket launchers, and over 150 other ground vehicles.
It makes an emergency landing at Canadian Forces Base Goose Bay in Newfoundland and Labrador, Canada.

October
1 October
 The Afghan Air Force mistakenly strikes a checkpoint in Nahri Saraj District in Afghanistan's Helmand Province, killing 10 and wounding nine. The dead and wounded are members of the Afghan government's Sangoryan militia, a force that wears local clothing and blends in with the population in areas where the Taliban is active.

3 October
 According to Major General Igor Konashenkov, a spokesman for the Russian Ministry of Defense, Russian Federation Air Force strikes in Syria kill 50 Islamic militants, including 12 commanders, and critically wound Levant Liberation Committee leader Abu Mohammed al-Golani. After Konashenkov announces the strikes on 4 October and the Syrian Observatory for Human Rights reports that 23 airstrikes hit a former Syrian Arab Air Force base occupied by Levant Liberation Committee forces on 3 October, the Levant Liberation Committee denies that al-Golani has been injured.

4 October
 Syrian activists claims that Syrian government attacks on Mayadeen, Syria, and surrounding villages during the day have included dozens of artillery rockets and barrel bombs, killing between 15 and 20 people in one village north of Mayadeen. The Syrian Observatory for Human Rights claims that over 1,000 airstrikes have occurred in and around Mayadeen since 29 September in support of a Syrian Arab Army offensive to take Mayadeen from the Islamic State.

6 October
 Syrian Civil Defence reports that 80 percent of the hundreds of pro-government airstrikes in Syria since the end of a sixth round of peace talks between Iran, Russia, and Turkey in mid-September have targeted civilian areas. The Syrian Observatory for Human Rights reports that September was the deadliest month of 2017 in Syria, with almost a thousand civilians killed.
 After the Cseries dumping petition by Boeing, the United States Department of Commerce moves to impose an 80 percent tariff on imported Canadian airliners, based on a Boeing complaint that Bombardier Aerospace deliberately violated international trade law in a 2016 sale of 75 Bombardier CS100 airliners to Delta Air Lines. The move, which is a separate action from the Commerce Department's 26 September decision to impose a 219 percent tariff on Bombardier Aerospace aircraft, would in combination with the 219 percent tariff quadruple the price of Bombardier Aerospace airliners in the United States and effectively price Bombardier Aerospace out of the U.S. market. Imposition of the two tariffs requires a favorable ruling by the United States International Trade Commission in a review scheduled for February 2018.

8 October
 A U.S. unmanned aerial vehicle hits a car in Raghwan District in Yemen's Ma'rib Governorate with an air-to-ground missile, killing the five men in the car. The men were suspected of being members of al-Qaeda in the Arabian Peninsula.

12 October
It is the first collision between a UAV and a commercial aircraft over North America. The King Air sustains only minor damage and lands safely without injury to anyone on board. Canadian Minister of Transport Marc Garneau will announce the collision on 15 October.

14 October
 The first scheduled commercial airline service in history to Saint Helena in the South Atlantic Ocean begins as an Airlink Embraer E190-100IGW with 78 passengers aboard arrives at Saint Helena Airport after a flight of about six hours from Johannesburg, South Africa, with a stop at Windhoek, Namibia. The flight inaugurates once-a-week scheduled service between Johannesburg and Saint Helena. Previously, with the exception of a single charter flight Airlink made in May, the island had relied for its connection with the outside world on visits once every three weeks by a British Royal Mail Ship, the cargo liner RMS St Helena, making a six-day voyage between South Africa and Saint Helena. Boosters hope the flights will establish Saint Helena as a tourist destination, but critics maintain that more extensive commercial service will be necessary to make the construction of the airport worthwhile.
 After arguing with a Spirit Airlines employee while trying to buy a ticket in a passenger terminal at New York City's LaGuardia Airport in Queens, New York, a man returns and places a package on the ticket counter, claiming it contains a bomb. He is arrested and the terminal is partially evacuated. The package does not contain a bomb, and activities in the terminal return to normal after about two hours.
 An Antonov An-26 operated by the Moldovan airline Valan International Cargo Charter, chartered by the French government in support of Operation Barkhane, crashes in the sea off Abidjan, Ivory Coast, killing four and injuring six more.

15 October
 Egyptian Air Force Apache attack helicopters assist Egyptian Army troops in repelling a series of coordinated attacks by Islamic militant insurgents in and around Sheikh Zweid in the northern part of Egypt's Sinai Peninsula. The Egyptians suffer six or seven killed (sources differ) and 37 wounded and claim to have killed 24 insurgents and wounded one and to have destroyed two insurgent sport utility vehicles.

16 October
All the Israeli aircraft return safely to base. Syria claims that its SAM battery fired after the Israeli aircraft crossed into Syrian airspace and that it hit one Israeli plane. About two hours after the incident, Israeli Air Force aircraft strike the SAM site, knocking it out.
 Airbus and Bombardier Aerospace announce a partnership on the CSeries program, with Airbus acquiring a 50.01% majority stake, Bombardier keeping 31% and Investissement Québec 19%, to expand in an estimated market of more than 6,000 new 100-150 seat aircraft over 20 years. Airbus' supply chain expertise should save production costs but headquarters and assembly remain in Québec while U.S. customers would benefit from a second assembly line in Mobile, Alabama. This transaction is subject to regulatory approvals and is expected to be completed in 2018. While assembling the aircraft in U.S. could circumvent the 300% duties proposed in the Cseries dumping petition by Boeing, Airbus CEO Tom Enders and Bombardier CEO Alain Bellemare assured that this factor did not drive the partnership, but negotiations began in August after the April 2017 filing and the June decision to proceed and, as a result, Boeing was suspicious.

17 October
 The Syrian Democratic Forces (SDF) claim that they have completed the capture ar-Raqqa, Syria, from the Islamic State. Since the offensive to retake the city – once the Islamic State's de facto capital – began in June, U.S. aircraft have pounded Islamic State positions in support of advancing SDF ground forces.
 After carrying only 13 percent of intra-Hawaii seats in the first three-quarters of 2017 – competing against Hawaiian Airlines, which carried 80 percent – and posting an operating loss of US$4.9 million and a net loss of US$8.2 million for the second quarter of 2017, Hawaii Island Air files for Chapter 11 bankruptcy protection after it fails to find new investors to satisfy lessors Wells Fargo Bank Northwest and Elix 8, who want to repossess its five Bombardier Q400s. It will cease operations on 11 November.

18 October
 The Saudi budget airline Flynas inaugurates the first direct commercial air service between Saudi Arabia and Iraq since the outbreak of the Gulf War in August 1990. The first flight departs from Riyadh and arrives in Baghdad.

19 October
 The re-engined Airbus A330neo-900 makes its first flight at Toulouse, France.

25 October
 At the end of a 120-day period devoted to developing new airline security requirements following the lifting of the March 2017 ban on electronic devices aboard flights to the United States from ten major airports in the Middle East, the U.S. Transportation Security Administration (TSA) announces new pre-takeoff security screening procedures for all airline passengers bound for the United States. The new requirements are broader than the earlier electronics ban, and a TSA spokeswoman explains only that they "affect all individuals, international passengers, and U.S. citizens traveling to the United States from a last-point-of-departure international location," apply to "all flights from airports that serve as last-points-of-departure locations to the United States," and involve stricter security procedures in airport terminals and around airliners on the ground and "heightened screening of personal electronic devices." Confusion over the new rules ensues, with airlines announcing different security procedures and different start dates for them. Cathay Pacific, EgyptAir, Emirates and Lufthansa announce that they will begin new screening procedures on 26 October, although their announced procedures differ. Air France says it will begin its new screening procedures at Paris Orly Airport on 26 October but not at Charles de Gaulle Airport until 2 November. Royal Jordanian announces that it will not begin its new procedures until mid-January 2018. Delta Air Lines simply advises passengers to arrive earlier at airports. Other airlines either make no announcement or say that their security procedures will not change under the new directive.
 In a move to slash regulations imposed by the U.S. Federal Aviation Administration (FAA) restricting the operation of unmanned aerial vehicles (UAVs), popularly referred to as "drones," in the United States, President Donald Trump directs United States Secretary of Transportation Elaine Chao to establish a pilot program creating "innovation zones" that permit far-reaching operation of UAVs in ways the FAA had prohibited, such as using UAVs for package delivery services, infrastructure inspection, and emergency management, and that streamline the process for permission to operate UAVs at night, over people, or out of sight of the UAV operator. The pilot program also will explore safety issues related to UAV flights and how technology can address the issues. United States Government officials say that the pilot program will allow the United States to keep pace with the development of UAV operations overseas and modernize the U.S. regulatory and air traffic management systems in an era when UAVs outnumber manned aircraft.

27 October
 After a final evening flight from Munich to Berlin, bankrupt Air Berlin ceases flight operations after 38 years in business.

30 October
 Jet aircraft bomb the eastern portion of Derna, Libya. A Libyan lawmaker reports that the evening airstrike hit a house, killing at least 12 people, and that another airstrike hit a shepherd and his family as they sat around a fire pit. The Shura Council of Darna Mujahedeen, which controls the city, blames the strikes on the Egyptian Air Force. On 1 November, Libyan officials will claim that the strikes killed dozens of people in Derna. Egypt condemns the strikes, but offers no further comment.

31 October
The Egyptian armed forces claim that the strikes killed "a large number" of Islamic militants that Egypt believes ambushed Egyptian police nearly two weeks earlier. An Egyptian military spokesman says the airstrikes destroyed three ground vehicles loaded with weapons, ammunition, and explosives.

November
6 November
 The Saudi-led coalition declares a blockade of Yemen that halts all air access to the country, as well as all land and sea access.

7 November
 United Airlines operates its last Boeing 747 flight, United Flight 747 from San Francisco International Airport to Daniel K. Inouye International Airport, Honolulu. The sold-out 374-seat flight aboard a Boeing 747-400 retraces the path of the first United Airlines Boeing 747 flight 47 years earlier in 1970. Boeing's retirement of the aircraft leaves Delta Air Lines as the only remaining U.S. operator of the Boeing 747.

8 November
ATR Aircraft launches the freighter variant of the ATR 72-600 with 30 firm orders plus 20 options from FedEx Express.

9 November
China Aviation Supplies Holding Company (CASC) orders 300 Boeing aircraft for $37 billion at list prices (a $M average). The order could include 260 737s and 40 787/777s.

10 November
EasyJet selects TUI Group deputy chief executive officer (CEO), Swedish businessman Johan Lundgren, as its next CEO: on 30 November, he is to succeed Carolyn McCall, who will become CEO of ITV plc television after leading EasyJet since 2010.

11 November
 Due to high levels of toxic smog in New Delhi, India – which it describes as "gas chamber" smog – United Airlines suspends service to New Delhi, canceling its flights from Newark Liberty International Airport in Newark, New Jersey, to New Delhi through at least 13 November.
 Hawaii Island Air ceases all operations after 37 years of service between Hawaii's islands. It had filed for Chapter 11 bankruptcy protection on 17 October.

12 November
 The Dubai Air Show, the third largest air show in the world by number of exhibitors, square meters, and visitors, opens, displaying 160 aircraft for 72,000 expected visitors. Airbus displays the A350-900 and A319 airliners and the A400M and C-295 military airlifters, while Beriev displays its Be-200ES jet amphibian, Boeing the 737 MAX 8 and 787-10 jetliners, Bombardier Aerospace the Bombardier CS300 small narrowbody, Embraer its Phenom 100 small business jet, and Sukhoi its Superjet 100 regional jet. The show will run through 16 November.
 At the Dubai Air Show, Emirates commits to purchase 40 Boeing 787-10s in two- and three-class cabins for 240 to 330 passengers, to be delivered from 2022 with conversion rights to the smaller Boeing 787-9, pushing orders for the 787-10 from 171 to over 200.

 15 November
 At the Dubai Air Show, Indigo Partners signs a memorandum of understanding for 430 Airbus – 273 A320neos and 157 A321neos – for US$49.5 billion at list prices; Indigo controls Frontier Airlines and JetSmart and holds stakes in Volaris and Wizz Air: 146 will go to Wizz Air, 134 to Frontier Airlines, 80 to Volaris, and 70 to JetSmart.
 At the same air show, Flydubai commits to ordering 175 Boeing 737 Max and 50 purchase rights for $27 billion at list prices: MAX 8s, MAX 9s and 50 Max 10s.

 21 November
 The large -1000 variant of the A350 XWB receives its type certification from the EASA and the FAA.

 27 November
 In the wake of insolvencies of Alitalia and airBerlin, Swiss Lugano-based regional Darwin Airline, operating six Saab 2000 and four ATR 72, enter insolvency proceedings four months after being acquired in July by Slovenia's Adria Airways owner, Luxembourg's private equity fund 4K Invest, from Etihad which owned one third since 2014.

 28 November
 Textron Aviation launches the Cessna SkyCourier, a twin-turboprop, high-wing, large-utility aircraft for an introduction in 2020 with its launch customer FedEx Express which ordered 50 cargo variants and 50 options.
 Airbus announces a partnership with Rolls-Royce and Siemens to develop the E-Fan X hybrid-electric aircraft demonstrator, to fly in 2020.

December

 7 December
 The Pilatus PC-24 receives EASA and FAA type certification, it is anticipated to enter service in January 2018.

 13 December
 Austrian leisure carrier Niki grounded flights and entered insolvency proceedings after the European Commission did not cleared the acquisition from insolvent Air Berlin to Lufthansa on competition grounds.
 Dassault abandons the Safran Silvercrest turbofan due to technical and schedule risks, ends the Falcon 5X development and will launch a new Falcon with the same cross section, Pratt & Whitney Canada engines and a  range for a 2022 introduction.

 14 December
 Delta Air Lines orders 100 Airbus A321neos, with 100 further options for $25.4 billion at list prices, to be delivered from 2020 to 2023; equipped with Pratt & Whitney PW1100Gs and seating 197, they will replace ageing Airbus A320s, Boeing 757-200s and MD-90s.

 15 December
 The Airbus board confirmed CEO Tom Enders will not stay beyond April 2019 and announced that in February 2018 commercial aircraft COO Fabrice Brégier will be replaced by Guillaume Faury, currently Airbus Helicopters CEO.

 18 December
 The Bell V-280 Valor makes its first flight : it takes off vertically, hover momentarily then land, without forward flight, its General Electric T64 engines remaining upright.

 21 December
 Boeing and Embraer confirmed to be discussing a potential combination with a transaction subject to Brazilian government regulators, the companies' boards and shareholders approvals.

 22 December
 The General Electric Advanced Turboprop makes its first ground run.
 After identifying deficiencies in its Operational Control System, Transport Canada suspends the Air Operator Certificate of West Wind Aviation in the wake of its December 13 accident of an ATR 42 at Fond-du-Lac.
 
 23 December
 Austrian general aviation manufacturer Diamond Aircraft Industries is acquired by Chinese Wanfeng Aviation.

 24 December
 The Chinese AVIC AG600, the largest amphibious aircraft, makes its maiden flight from Zhuhai Airport in the southern province of Guangdong.

 25 December
 The first ACAE CJ-1000AX turbofan demonstrator assembly is completed after an 18-month process before 24 more prototypes support an airworthiness certification campaign to enter service on the Comac C919 after 2021.

 29 December
 IAG announces it will buy assets of Niki, previously part of the Air Berlin group, for €20 million for up to 15 A320s and slots at Vienna, Düsseldorf, Munich, Palma and Zurich airports; providing up to €16.5 million in liquidity, 740 former NIKI employees will run an Austrian Vueling subsidiary.

 31 December

First flights

March
 29 March – Embraer 195-E2 PR-ZIJ
 31 March
Airbus A319neo D-AVWA
Antonov/Taqnia An-132 UR-EXK
Boeing 787-10 N528ZC

April
 13 April – Boeing 737 MAX 9 N7379E

May
 5 May – Comac C919 B-001A
 25 May - Lockheed Martin LM-100J (N5103D)
 28 May – Irkut MC-21 73051

July
 5 July - Dassault Falcon 5X F-WFVX
18 July - Lancair Mako (N580L)

August
 16 August - Indonesian Aerospace N-219 PK-XDT
 31 August - Elixir Aircraft Elixir F-WLXR

October
 11 October - Scaled Composites 401
 19 October - Airbus A330neo-900

November
 18 November - Beriev A-100

December
 17 December - Rans S-21 Outbound N215RD 
 18 December - Bell V-280 Valor
 24 December – AVIC AG600.

Entered service

May 
 22 May : Boeing 737 MAX-8 with Malindo Air
 31 May: A321neo with Virgin America, configured with 184 seats and LEAP engines.

Retirements

December
 13 December : Shin Meiwa US-1A.

References

Further reading
 
 
 
 
 
 
 
 
 

 
Military operations of the Syrian civil war in 2017
Aviation by year
2017-related lists